Josef Becker (February 8, 1905 – October 19, 1996) was a German politician of the Christian Democratic Union (CDU) and former member of the German Bundestag.

Life 
Before 1933 Becker was a member of the Centre Party. In 1945, he participated in the founding of the CDP, which later became the Rhineland-Palatinate state association of the CDU. In 1946, he was elected to the executive board of the Pirmasens district CDU association and was later its chairman until 1968. Becker had been a member of the Citizens' Council Committee since July 1945 and was a council member of the city of Pirmasens from 1946 to 1979. In 1946/47 he was a member of the Advisory State Assembly of the State of Rhineland-Palatinate.

He was a member of the German Bundestag from its first election in 1949 to 1972. In parliament he represented the constituency of Zweibrücken from 1949 to 1965 and then the constituency of Pirmasens until 1972. 

From 1946 to 1948, Becker was second mayor of Pirmasens.

Literature

References

1905 births
1996 deaths
Members of the Bundestag for Rhineland-Palatinate
Members of the Bundestag 1969–1972
Members of the Bundestag 1965–1969
Members of the Bundestag 1961–1965
Members of the Bundestag 1957–1961
Members of the Bundestag 1953–1957
Members of the Bundestag 1949–1953
Members of the Bundestag for the Christian Democratic Union of Germany